Shadow of the Eagle (Finnish: Kaksipäisen kotkan varjossa) is a 2005 Finnish film directed and written by Timo Koivusalo.

Plot
The film is about an early twentieth century Finnish poet under the Russian regime.

Cast
Mikko Leppilampi as Aaro
Vesa-Matti Loiri as Verneri
Helena Vierikko as Ella
Anneli Saaristo as Saara
Tapio Liinoja as commander
Anna-Kaisa Tommila as Veera
Vesa Vierikko as vicar
Eriikka Väliahde as Maria
Esko Nikkari as Aaro's father
Seela Sella as Aaro's mother
Antti Luusuaniemi as Antti
Sampo Sarkola as Aleksi

External links

Finnish historical drama films
2000s Finnish-language films
2005 films
Films directed by Timo Koivusalo